The 1933–34 season was Blackpool F.C.'s 33rd season (30th consecutive) in the Football League. They competed in the 22-team Division Two, then the second tier of English football, finishing eleventh.

Sandy MacFarlane succeeded Harry Evans as manager prior to the start of the season.

Jimmy Hampson was the club's top scorer for the seventh consecutive season, with thirteen goals.

Table

Notes

References

Blackpool F.C.
Blackpool F.C. seasons